Hostile Moments is a 12" vinyl only EP by the American heavy metal band Pantera.

Content
Released in 1994, the EP contains four tracks. Track one is from the (then) forthcoming album Far Beyond Driven, track two is from Vulgar Display of Power, and tracks three and four are remixes.

The gatefold vinyl contains a large black and white picture of Phil Anselmo's 'Unscarred' stomach tattoo, with the lyrics from "I'm Broken" in silver writing covering the picture.

The 12" vinyl is very rare and fetches high prices on online auction sites.

Track listing
All tracks written by Pantera.
"I'm Broken"
"Mouth for War"
"Walk (Cervical Mix)"
"Fucking Hostile (Biomechanical Mix)"

Personnel
Pantera
Phil Anselmo – vocals
Rex Brown – bass
"Dimebag" Darrell – guitar
Vinnie Paul – drums

Other
JG Thirlwell – remix (track 3)
Justin Broadrick – remix (track 4)
 Produced, engineered and mixed by Terry Date and Vinnie Paul.
 Co-produced by Pantera
 "Walk (Cervical Mix)" remixed at 'Powerplay'. Remix engineer: Rob Sutton. Assistant: Alex Armitage.
 "Fucking Hostile (Biomechanical Mix)" remixed at 'Avalanche Studios', Birmingham, England.
 Front cover photo by Joe Giron.

1994 EPs
Atco Records EPs
Pantera albums